Bikihakola is a census town in Panchla CD Block of Howrah Sadar subdivision in Howrah district in the state of West Bengal, India.

Geography
Bikihakola is located at

Demographics
As per 2011 Census of India Bikihakola had a total population of 14,540 of which 7,517 (52%) were males and 7,023 (48%) were females. Population below 6 years was 1,749. The total number of literates in Bikihakola was 10,557 (82.53% of the population over 6 years).

 India census, Bikihakola had a population of 11,901. Males constitute 52% of the population and females 48%. Bikihakola has an average literacy rate of 66%, higher than the national average of 59.5%; with male literacy of 72% and female literacy of 59%. 14% of the population is under 6 years of age.

References

Cities and towns in Howrah district